The Mausoleum of Imam Awn al-Din was a historic shrine that was located in Mosul, Iraq. In 2014 the shrine was destroyed by the Islamic State of Iraq and Levant.

History 
The mausoleum was built in 1248 by the Atabeg of Mosul, Badr al-Din Lu'lu. It was built over the tomb of Imam Awn al-Din, the son of the third Shia Imam, Hasan ibn Ali. The structure was restored twice, first in 1744 and then 1776. In 1964, the exterior was covered with plaster, hiding the external decorations.

Construction 
The mausoleum was cube-shaped and entered on its North side. It was topped by a recessed cube, which was a support for the octagonal base of the twelve-sided conical, pyramidal brick dome. The mihrab was found in the southwest corner of the shrine and consists of two panels that join at the corner to form a niche. The decorations on both the exterior and interior included extensive floral motifs and an inscription band again revealing the unnecessary name of Badr al-Din Lu'lu and its date of construction in 1248.  The wooden sarcophagus of Imam Awn al-Din ibn al-Hasan ibn Ali was carved with floral motifs on its exterior. It also holds an inscription to Badr al-Din Lu'lu.

On the east of the tomb chamber was an iwan. In front of the iwan, there was a private cemetery reserved for Ottoman Pashas and their relatives.

During the 1964 restoration, the lower part of the building was covered with a thick layer of plaster. The upper layer which held the brick decoration was covered with a thin layer of white plaster.

2014 demolition 
The Mausoleum of Imam Awn al-Din was destroyed with explosives in July 2014 by the Islamic State of Iraq and the Levant.

References 

Mausoleums in Iraq
Buildings and structures in Mosul